Ixtapa Municipality is one of the 119 municipalities of Chiapas, in southern Mexico.

As of 2010, the municipality had a total population of 24,517, up from 18,533 as of 2005. It covers an area of 313 km².

As of 2010, the town of Ixtapa had a population of 6,086. Other than the town of Ixtapa, the municipality had 82 localities, the largest of which (with 2010 populations in parentheses) were: El Nopal (1,903), Cacate (1,225), Aztlán (Rancho Nuevo) (1,148), Concepción (1,133), and El Zapotillo (1,058), classified as rural.

References

Municipalities of Chiapas